Ilda Maria Bengue (born October 30, 1974) is a retired Angolan handball player.

Summer Olympics
Bengue played for Angola at the 2000 and 2004 Summer Olympics in Athens, in which she ranked 4th with 38 goals and at the 2008 Summer Olympics in Beijing.

World Cup
She competed in the 2005 and 2007  World Championships, the latter in which Angola finished 7th, (the country's best performance ever) with Bengue scoring 56 goals and ranking 9th on the championship's list of top scorers.

Yahoo! Sports Profile

References

External links

1974 births
Living people
Handball players from Luanda
Angolan female handball players
Olympic handball players of Angola
Handball players at the 2000 Summer Olympics
Handball players at the 2004 Summer Olympics
Handball players at the 2008 Summer Olympics